Mohammed Al-Nukhylan (born 11 February 2002), is a Saudi Arabian professional footballer who plays as a defender for Saudi Professional League side Al-Faisaly.

Career statistics

Club

Notes

Honours

Club
Al-Faisaly
King Cup: 2020–21

References

External links
 

2002 births
Living people
Saudi Arabian footballers
Association football defenders
Saudi Professional League players
Saudi First Division League players
Al-Faisaly FC players